Armando Cavazzuti (born January 23, 1929 - October 31, 2014) was an Italian professional football player and manager, who played as a midfielder.

Career
Cavazzuti played for 7 seasons (97 games, 16 goals) in the Italian Serie A for Modena F.C., U.S. Città di Palermo, A.S. Roma and Udinese Calcio; he also played for Pisa, Cagliari, Venezia, Biellese, and Reggina throughout his career. During his spell with his hometown club Modena, he became the last player in Italy to score a goal against the Grande Torino side which dominated Italian football in the mid to late 1940s, scoring in a 3–1 defeat to Torino on 17 April 1949.

Death
Cavazzuti died on 31 October 2014 at the age of 85, in his hometown Modena.

References

1929 births
2014 deaths
Italian footballers
Serie A players
Modena F.C. players
Pisa S.C. players
Palermo F.C. players
A.S. Roma players
Cagliari Calcio players
Udinese Calcio players
Venezia F.C. players
Reggina 1914 players
Association football midfielders
A.S.D. La Biellese players